= Koresa =

Town of ancient Lydia

Coordinates: 38°37′27″N 28°35′09″E

Koresa was a town of ancient Lydia, inhabited during Roman times.

Its site is located near Palankaya in Asiatic Turkey.
